Antonio Gomez Aguirre was the fifth president (governor) of the Brazilian state of Espírito Santo.  He was appointed for the function by the President of Brazil, Marshall Manuel Deodoro da Fonseca, and governed the state from 11 March to 7 June 1891.

Governors of Espírito Santo
Year of death missing
Year of birth missing